The 1966 Bulgarian Cup Final was the 26th final of the Bulgarian Cup (in this period the tournament was named Cup of the Soviet Army), and was contested between Slavia Sofia and CSKA Sofia on 10 September 1966 at Vasil Levski National Stadium in Sofia. Slavia won the final 1–0.

Route to the Final

Match

Details

See also
1965–66 A Group

References

Bulgarian Cup finals
PFC Slavia Sofia matches
PFC CSKA Sofia matches
Cup Final